Craig Campbell (born 18 July 1963) is a former professional tennis player from South Africa.

Career
Campbell, who played collegiate tennis for the University of Miami, made the round of 16 at the 1984 Japan Open Tennis Championships, defeating world number 63 Nduka Odizor en route. Partnering Joey Rive, Campbell was a losing doubles finalist at the Swedish Open in 1986. The following year, he reached the singles quarter-finals in the Tel Aviv Open.

He was only able to progress past the first round of a Grand Slam tournament once, which was at the 1990 French Open, in the mixed doubles with Mary Pierce. His two appearances in the main singles draw ended in disappointment. In the 1986 US Open he squandered a two set lead to lose to Bob Green and he was defeated in another five set match at the 1989 US Open, to Peter Lundgren.

Grand Prix career finals

Doubles: 1 (0–1)

References

1963 births
Living people
South African male tennis players
Miami Hurricanes men's tennis players
Sportspeople from Cape Town